The 2007 All-Ireland Under-21 Hurling Championship was the 44th staging of the All-Ireland Under-21 Hurling Championship since its establishment by the Gaelic Athletic Association in 1964.

Kilkenny were the defending champions, however, they were beaten by Offaly in the Leinster semi-final.

On 8 September 2007, Galway won the championship following a 5-11 to 0-12 defeat of Dublin in the All-Ireland final. This was their 9th All-Ireland title in the under-21 grade and their second in three championship seasons.

Dublin's Alan McCrabbe was the championship's top scorer with 2-35.

Results

Leinster Under-21 Hurling Championship

Quarter-finals

Semi-finals

Final

Munster Under-21 Hurling Championship

Quarter-final

Semi-finals

Final

Ulster Under-21 Hurling Championship

Semi-final

Final

All-Ireland Under-21 Hurling Championship

Semi-finals

Final

Top scorers

Overall

Single game

Championship statistics

Miscellaneous

 Derry win the Ulster title for the first time since 1997.
 Dublin reach the All-Ireland final for the first time since 1972.

References

Under-21
All-Ireland Under-21 Hurling Championship